Reeuwijk-Dorp is a village in the Dutch province of South Holland. It is part of what used to be the municipality of Reeuwijk. It lies about 5 km north of Gouda. "Dorp" is Dutch for village, the name distinguishes from Reeuwijk-Brug which is situated 3 km to the east. 

Reeuwijk-Drop is a stretched out peat excavation village from the Middle Ages. The Catholic St Paul and Peter Church is a Gothic Revival church built between 1889 and 1890. It is characterised by its short nave.

Reeuwijk-Dorp was originally the main village, however the Reeuwijk-Brug was more strategically located and became the seat of the municipality from the mid-19th century onwards. In 2011, the municipality was merged into Bodegraven-Reeuwijk.

Gallery

References

Bodegraven-Reeuwijk
Populated places in South Holland